Caitlin Deans (born 5 December 1999) is a New Zealand swimmer. She competed in the women's 800 metre freestyle event at the 2018 FINA World Swimming Championships (25 m), in Hangzhou, China.

References

External links
 

1999 births
Living people
New Zealand female swimmers
New Zealand female freestyle swimmers
Place of birth missing (living people)